Yle Fem (Yle Five) was Yle's Finland-Swedish national television channel, providing television programmes in the Swedish language in Finland. It was a public-service channel principally intended for Finland's Swedish-speaking minority. Creating understanding over the language and culture border was also one of the channel's recognized objectives.

History
Yle Fem was launched in 1988 as a late-evening programming block called FST (Finlands Svenska Television, literally "Finland's Swedish Television") which was broadcast on Monday nights on Yle TV2 and on Tuesday nights on Yle TV1, after the conclusion of MTV3's Kymmenen Uutiset (10pm evening news) on either channel. It was relaunched as its own dedicated channel called YLE FST on 27 August 2001, and was called YLE FST5 from 2006 to 2012 but the name was changed because the viewers thought the name was only a combination of letters (Fem is Swedish for five.). Initially, Finlands Svenska Television's output was formerly included in the programming of Yle's two main television channels, TV1 and TV2. Yle Fem and Yle Teema were merged into one network on 24 April 2017, as Yle Teema & Fem.

TV programmes

360 grader
Bettina S.
Buu-klubben - broadcasting cartoons for kids dubbed in Swedish
D-Dax
Enigma
Falkenswärds möbler
Fribby
Idrottsbiten
JOX
Kortnytt
I Mumindalen
Melodifestivalen
Neon
Nordiska videolistan
Närbild Svenskfinland
OBS
Oppåner å hitådit
Pussel
Ratatosk
Scen
Schlager på lager
Sicsac
Solarplexus
Solo
Sportnytt
Spotlight
Strömsö
TV-Nytt
Tärningen
Vad gör Petra?
X-tra

In addition, Yle Fem simulcasts a significant amount of programming from SVT World, the international channel of Sweden's Public Broadcaster SVT.

See also
List of Finnish television channels

References

External links 
Yle Fem - Official site

Yle television channels
Publicly funded broadcasters
Television channels and stations established in 1988
Television channels and stations disestablished in 2017
Finland-Swedish television shows
Defunct television channels in Finland